Julio César Pérez Peredo (born 24 October 1991) is a Bolivian professional footballer who plays as a defender for Bolivian Primera División club Oriente Petrolero.

Career statistics

Club

References

1991 births
Living people
Bolivian footballers
Association football defenders
Oriente Petrolero players
Guabirá players
Sport Boys Warnes players
The Strongest players